Anette Støvelbæk (born 27 July 1967) is a Danish actress. She was born in Copenhagen and is married to actor Lars Mikkelsen.

She made her screen debut as Olympia in the Danish comedy film Italian for Beginners (2000).

Selected filmography

References

External links 
 

Danish film actresses
1967 births
Living people
Actresses from Copenhagen